Bactrocera continua is a species of Tephritidae fruit fly.

References

continua
Insects described in 1919